Cornelissen is a Dutch patronymic surname meaning "son of Cornelis". It may refer to:

 Adelinde Cornelissen (born 1979), Dutch dressage rider
 Christiaan Cornelissen (1864–1942), Dutch syndicalist writer, economist, trade unionist, and anarchist
 Dien Cornelissen (1924–2015), Dutch politician
 Ko Cornelissen (1904–1954), Dutch boxer
 Marie Cornelissen (1850–1921), French-born English painter
 Marije Cornelissen (born 1974), Dutch politician
  (born 1934), Dutch politician
 Peter Cornelissen, pseudonym of Fritz-Otto Busch (1890–1971), German naval writer
 Ton Cornelissen (born 1964), Dutch footballer

See also
Cornelisse

Dutch-language surnames
Patronymic surnames
Surnames from given names